Konstantinas Žukas was a Lithuanian statesman and military figure who was the Chief of Defense of Lithuania from July 7, 1920 to April 7, 1921 as well as participating in the Polish–Lithuanian War.

Biography
After graduating from Kaunas Primary School, his parents moved to Obeliai and he learned to work by telegraph at the railway station. In 1899, Žukas with his family, went to Siberia and lived and worked as a telegraphist in Achinsk and Krasnoyarsk.

On 1906, Žukas returned to Lithuania and passed the graduation exams of Kaunas Maironis University Gymnasium externally. He later volunteered for the Russian Imperial Army and from 1907 - 1910, studied at Vilnius Military School. After receiving his assignment to Kharkov, he served as commander of the communications team in the 121st Infantry Regiment. During the First World War, Žukas served as the Divisional Communications Chief on the Galician Front and was Captain by then.

On 1918, Žukas returned to Lithuania again and organized a militia force in Raseiniai and became its commander. From February 8, 1919, he was a volunteer for the Lithuanian Armed Forces and assigned to the 1st Infantry Regiment. Žukas then became the Marijampolė Communications Team Chief and was Reserve Battalion Commander and was Major by then. From May 1919, he was Commander of the Užnemunė Front.

From April 14, 1920 to October 30, 1921, he served as a Representative of the Lithuanian Farmers and Greens Union in the Constituent Assembly of Lithuania. From October 19, 1920 to April 7, 1921, he served Chief of Defense of Lithuania of Kazys Grinius and promoted to Colonel. In addition, from July 7, 1920 to April 7, 1921, he was Commander in Chief of the Lithuanian Army. He resigned from the mandate of a member of the Seimas.

Later, he was Assistant to the Chief of the General Staff of the Lithuanian Armed Forces, since March 1922. Commander of the 4th Border Division, organized the Border Guard Army. Since 1924, he was Chief of Staff of the Second Division. He was also a Lecturer of the Higher Officers' Courses and Vytautas the Great Military School. On 1926, he was promoted to Lieutenant General and soon went to the reserves but still worked as a representative of foreign firms.

He also collaborated in the publications "Verslo žinynas", "Kardas". He also wrote the Statute of the Internal Service of the Lithuanian Armed Forces.

In 1944, Žukas left for Germany and in 1949, emigrated to the United States and settled in Cleveland, participated in the activities of the Lithuanian Soldiers 'Veterans' Union Ramovė.

References

Bibliography
Looking to the past. Memories of a man and a soldier. Material for historians. 1959  m.
Žukas Konstantinas, Lithuanian Encyclopedia, Boston, 1966, vol. 35, p. 421.
Truska L., Žukas Konstantinas, Biographical Dictionary of the Members of the Lithuanian Seimas (1920–1922), comp. A. Ragauskas, M. Tamošaitis, Vilnius, 2006, p. 447–449.

1884 births
1962 deaths
Lithuanian generals
Ministers of Defence of Lithuania
Military personnel from Kaunas
Russian military personnel of World War I
Lithuanian emigrants to the United States